HHH  may refer to:

People
 H. H. Holmes, one of America's first modern-day serial killers
 Hans-Hermann Hoppe (born 1949), Austrian school economist of German origin
 Hubert H. Humphrey (1911–1978), the 38th Vice President of the United States
 Hunter Hunt-Hendrix, musician best known for her project Liturgy

 Hunter Hearst Helmsley (Triple H), stage name of professional wrestler Paul Levesque

Places
 Haven of Hope Hospital, a public hospital in Hong Kong
 Hilton Head Airport, in South Carolina, United States
 Hilton Head Island High School, in South Carolina, United States
 Holland Heineken House

Groups, organizations, companies
 Hash House Harriers, an international group of running clubs
 Hog Hoggidy Hog, a South African band
 Hot Hot Heat, a Canadian band

Other uses
 Hugo's House of Horrors, a computer game
 Hungry Hungry Hippos, a tabletop game
 Hyperornithinemia-hyperammonemia-homocitrullinuria syndrome

See also

 HHHR Tower, in Dubai
 Triple H (disambiguation)
 3H (disambiguation)
 H3 (disambiguation)